ISAF Sailing Games were a sailing festival organised by the International Sailing Federation held every four years from 1994 to 2006.

History
Beginning in 1994, ISAF World Sailing Games were held on four occasions. The 1994 IYRU Cup saw more than 1000 sailors from 76 countries. The events were match racing, 470 (men and women), Hobie 16 (open and women), women's J/22, J/24, men's Laser, women's Laser Radial.

In 1998, ISAF hosted the 1998 ISAF World Sailing Games in women's match racing, 470 (men and women), Hobie 16 (open and women), J/22 (open and women), men's Laser and women's Laser Radial.

For the 2002 event, the selected classes were 470 (men and women), Hobie 16 (open and women), women's J/22, J/80, men's Laser, women's Laser Radial, Techno 293 (open and women). In the 2002 event, each country could have two sailors per event, with addition to the ISAF rankings leaders in Olympic classes, winners of the preceding 1998 games and winners of the 2000 Olympics.

The 2006 ISAF World Sailing Games had 420 team racing, 470 (men and women), 49er, women's Hobie 16, Hobie Tiger, men's Laser, women's Laser Radial, and RS:X (men and women). In the 2006 event, sailors from similar classes were invited to participate, e.g. the medalists from 2005 Finn Gold Cup and the world champions in Byte, Contender, and OK were invited to the men's one-person dinghy event in Laser.

Editions

Equipment

Legend: M – Men; W – Women; Mx – Mixed; O – Open;

References

 
Defunct sailing competitions
World Sailing